Deborah Willis may refer to:
Deborah Willis (artist) (born 1948), American artist, photographer and educator
Deborah Willis (author) (born 1982), Canadian short story writer